Hexanchus collinsonae (named after M. E. Collinson) is a species of prehistoric shark that was found in the Eocene London Clay beds. It is a member of the family Hexanchidae.

External links
https://web.archive.org/web/20050119064747/http://www.squali.com/fossili/hexanchus_collinsonae_1.jpg

Hexanchus
Eocene sharks
Fish described in 1979
Eocene fish of Europe
Fossil taxa described in 1979